This article contains a list of named passenger trains in Sri Lanka, by operator.

Sri Lanka Railways

Regular services 
In the mid-1950s, Sri Lanka Railways, under the leadership of B. D. Rampala, started to name major passenger services.

 Udarata Menike (Upcountry Maiden) - No. 1015 & 1016
Colombo to Badulla (Runs via Kandy)
Podi Menike (Little Maiden) - No. 1005 & 1006
Colombo to Badulla (Runs via Kandy)
Tikiri Menike (Little Maiden) - No. 1023 & 1024
Colombo to Nano Oya
Senkadagala Menike (Maiden of “Senkadagala” – area name) - No. 1035 & 1036
Colombo to Kandy
Yal Devi (Princess/Queen of Jaffna) - No. 4077& 4078
Mount-Lavinia to Kankasanthurai (Runs via Jaffna) 
 Uttara Devi (Princess/Queen of the North) - No. 4017 & 4018 
 Colombo Fort to Kankasanthurai (Intercity).
Colombo to Batticaloa
Rajarata Rejini (Regant of the land of kings) - No. 8085, 8086, 4085, & 4086
Vavuniya to Beliatta (Runs via Colombo)
Ruhunu Kumari (Princess of “Ruhuna” – southern province) - No. 8058 & 8059
Maradana to Matara (Runs via Colombo-fort)
Muthu Kumari (Pearl princes) - No. 3427 
Panadura to Chilaw (Runs via Colombo-fort)
Samudra Devi (Queen of the Oceans) - No. 8760 & 8327
Colombo to Galle
Galu Kumari (Princess of Galle) - No. 8056 & 8057
Maradana to Beliatta  (Runs via Colombo-fort)
Sagarika (Ocean Girl) - No. 8096 & 8097
Colombo (Maradana) to Mathara
Sri Devi-No. 4003 & 4004
Colombo(Fort) to Kankesanthurai 
Meena Gaya - No. 6079Runs between Colombo and BatticaloaBadulla night express
Colombo fort to Badulla
 Denuwara Manike - No. 1001 & 1002From Colombo Fort to Badulla Pulathisi - No. 6075
  Colombo fort to Batticloa Dakshina - No. 8054
 Maradhana to Beliatta Discontinued services 
 Boat Mail (discontinued since 23 December 1964) Service was operated between Colombo and Chennai, India, with ferry service to cross Rama Sethu. HijraColombo Fort to Batticaloa via Trincomalee Special services 
Bradby Express - Colombo to Kandy (connecting the Colombo and Kandy legs of the annual Bradby Shield Encounter of rugby union)

 Airport and aviation services 
Airport Express - Colombo Secretariat to Bandaranaike International Airport using a Hitachi Class S5 DMU4.

  J.F. Tours & Travels 
Viceroy Special - Colombo to Kandy, Badulla, or Galle; by charter'' (Tourist excursion train powered by steam)

See also

 Sri Lanka Railways

References

Sri Lanka